The term Christianity in Macedonia may refer to:

 Christianity in Macedonia (region)
 Christianity in Macedonia (Greece)
 Christianity in North Macedonia
 Christianity in Pirin Macedonia (Bulgaria)

See also 
 Religion in Macedonia (disambiguation)
 Macedonia (disambiguation)
 Macedonian (disambiguation)